Operation Pink Squad (released in the Philippines as Lady Enforcers Strike Again) is a 1988 Hong Kong action comedy film written and directed by Jeffrey Lau and starring Sandra Ng, Ann Bridgewater, Suki Kwan, Elsie Chan, Wu Fung, Ng Man-tat, Yuen Cheung-yan, and Ricky Hui. The film was released in Hong Kong on 17 November 1988.

Plot
Inspector Wu assigns a group of female detectives to look after a blind suspect named Piu, while a female robber who previously kidnapped him is out to retrieve some diamonds she thinks he possesses.

Cast
Sandra Ng as Ng Siu-mui
Ann Bridgewater as Plastic Flower
Suki Kwan as dumb female cop
Elsie Chan as Shy Grass
Wu Fung as Wu
Ng Man-tat as Uncle Wong
Yuen Cheung-yan as Tired-out triad
Ricky Hui as Dumb Ying
Pal Sinn as Piu
Law Ching-ho
Billy Lau as Big Nose
Charlie Cho as cop who gets transferred
Chan Fai-hung
Jeffrey Falcon as caucasian killer
Melanie Barter as Diana
Anna Strike as superintendent's wife

Release
Operation Pink Squad was released in Hong Kong on 17 November 1988. In the Philippines, the film was released as Lady Enforcers Strike Again by First Films on 7 April 1989, connecting it to the unrelated film The Inspector Wears Skirts (released as Lady Enforcer).

Home media
Operation Pink Squad was released on VHS in Japan by TDK.

The film was released on DVD by Winson Entertainment Distribution in Hong Kong on 8 February 2002. In the United States, the film was released on DVD by Televista on 20 March 2007.

References

External links

1988 films
1980s action comedy films
1988 comedy films
1980s Cantonese-language films
Golden Harvest films
Hong Kong action comedy films
1980s Hong Kong films